Bluebeard is the title character in a 1697 fairy tale by Charles Perrault.

Bluebeard may also refer to:

People
Joe Ball (1986-1938), American serial killer
Alfred Leonard Cline (1888–1948), American serial killer
Alexey Gromov (born 1970), Russian serial killer
Johann Otto Hoch (1855–1906), German-American serial killer
Arwed Imiela (1929-1982), German serial killer
Henri Désiré Landru or Bluebeard (1869–1922), French serial killer
Robin Page (1932–2015), artist also known as Bluebeard
Francisco Guerrero Pérez (1840-1910), Mexican serial killer
Harry Powers (1892-1932), Dutch-American serial killer
Gilles de Rais (1405–1440), Baron de Rais, medieval serial killer
Helmuth Schmidt (1876–1918), American serial killer

Film
Blue Beard (1901 film), a film by Georges Méliès
Bluebeard (1944 film), a film by Edgar G. Ulmer, starring John Carradine
Bluebeard (1951 film), a film by Christian-Jaque
Bluebeard (1955 film), a Mexican comedy film
Bluebeard (1972 film), a film by Edward Dmytryk, starring Richard Burton
Bluebeard (2009 film), a film by Catherine Breillat, starring Dominique Thomas
Bluebeard (2016 film), an Argentine film
Bluebeard (2017 film), a film by Lee Soo-yeon
Landru (film) or Bluebeard, a 1963 French film by Claude Chabrol, starring Charles Denner

Literature
Bluebeard (Frisch novel), a 1982 novel by Max Frisch
Bluebeard (Vonnegut novel), a 1987 novel by Kurt Vonnegut
Bluebeard, a 1970 play by Charles Ludlam
In Bluebeard's Castle: Some Notes Towards the Redefinition of Culture, 1971 book by essayist and literary critic George Steiner
Fables (comics), a comic book series published 2002 and 2015 featuring Bluebeard from the fairytale among its characters

Music
"Bluebeard" (song), a 1993 song by Cocteau Twins from Four-Calendar Café
"Bluebeard", a 1996 song by Combustible Edison from Schizophonic!
"Blue Beard", a 2010 song by Band of Horses from the album Infinite Arms

Other uses
Caryopteris or bluebeard, a genus of the mint family
Bluebeard, an operetta known for the song "If Ever I Cease to Love"
Bluebeard (ballet), a ballet choreographed by Marius Petipa to the music of Pyotr Schenk
Bluebeard, a restaurant in the US state of Indiana
The callsigns of eight American Sea Stallion helicopters in Operation Eagle Claw

See also
Barbe-bleue (opera) (Blue-beard), an 1866 operetta by Jacques Offenbach
Mavi Sakal ("Bluebeard" in Turkish), a Turkish rock band formed in 1980
Bluebeard's Castle, a 1911 opera by Béla Bartók
Ariane et Barbe-bleue, a 1907 opera by Paul Dukas
Ritter Blaubart, a 1920 opera by Emil Nikolaus von Reznicek
Conomor (fl. c. 540), also known as Conomerus or Conomor the Cursed
Bye, Bye Bluebeard, a 1949 Warner Brothers cartoon in the Merrie Melodies series
Blackbeard (disambiguation)
Redbeard (disambiguation)
Bluebead (disambiguation)
Bluebeam (disambiguation)
Bluebeat (disambiguation)